Nasrollah Soltaninejad was an Iranian freestyle wrestler. He won a silver medal at the 1961 World Championships.

References

1936 births
1995 deaths
People from Qom
Iranian male sport wrestlers
World Wrestling Championships medalists
20th-century Iranian people